The Abomination (also known as Emil Blonsky) is a character appearing in American comic books published by Marvel Comics. Created by writer Stan Lee and artist Gil Kane, the character first appeared in Tales to Astonish #90 (April 1967). He is one of the main enemies of the superhero Hulk, and possesses powers similar to his after also being exposed to gamma rays.

Debuting in the Silver Age of Comic Books, the character has been featured in other Marvel-endorsed products such as arcade and video games, television series, merchandise such as action figures and trading cards. Tim Roth portrays Emil Blonsky / The Abomination in the live-action Marvel Cinematic Universe (MCU) films The Incredible Hulk (2008) and Shang-Chi and the Legend of the Ten Rings (2021), as well as the Disney+ series She-Hulk: Attorney at Law (2022).

Publication history
Stan Lee chose the name "the Abomination", which he realized belonged to no other character, before conceiving the character's background and appearance. Lee recalled that he simply told the artist Gil Kane to "make him bigger and stronger than the Hulk and we'll have a lot of fun with him."

Emil Blonsky first appeared in Tales to Astonish, and was introduced as a KGB agent and spy who became the Abomination after deliberately exposing himself to a greater quantity of the same gamma radiation that transformed Bruce Banner into his alter ego the Hulk, using a machine Banner was planning on using to commit suicide. In his first appearance, Blonsky became a large scaly humanoid even stronger than the Hulk. In accordance with Lee's wishes, the character defeated the Hulk in their first battle.

The character has been featured in a number of Marvel titles, gradually shifting from unthinking, savage brute, to master schemer, to tortured soul, and finally repentant villain and occasional defender of the weak before being killed in battle by the Red Hulk.

Fictional character biography
Emil Blonsky was born in Zagreb (now the capital and largest city of Croatia, then part of Yugoslavia) and became a KGB agent who infiltrated an Air Force Base in New Mexico where Dr. Bruce Banner was attempting to kill the Hulk through overexposure to gamma rays. Blonsky triggers Banner turning into the Hulk, subsequently becoming a hideous lizard-like creature himself.

The Abomination reappears when summoned by a coven of witches to briefly battle the cosmic hero the Silver Surfer and summons Thor (via an absent Stranger's technology) to aid him in escaping the Stranger's laboratory world. Thor frees the Abomination and the other captives, but, on discovering they are all evil, uses his mystic hammer Mjolnir to time travel several hours into the past to undo his mistake. After defeating the Abomination and placing the Abomination in prison, Thor departs. When the Hulk is defeated by the alien Xeron the Star Slayer and brought aboard a space vessel, the Abomination is revealed to be First Mate of the alien crew. When the captain of the vessel directs Xeron and the crew to battle a creature in space, the Hulk and the Abomination are thrown from the vessel and battle until the pair are drawn into Earth's orbit and separated.

It is revealed in flashback that the Abomination entered into a coma-like state upon impacting with Earth and is buried for two years. Revived by an off-course missile fired from Hulkbuster Base (under Ross's jurisdiction), the Abomination joins forces with General Ross to defeat the Hulk, but is battered into submission by an angered Hulk. The Abomination reappears with fellow Hulk foe the Rhino, and the pair activates a gamma bomb at the Hulkbuster base in an attempt to destroy the Hulk. The Hulk's companion of the time, Jim Wilson, deactivates the bomb and the Hulk tricks the villains during combat, forcing them to collide and knock each other unconscious. A comatose Abomination is eventually found by soldiers at Ross's direction and has a miniature bomb implanted in his skull, being told to fight and defeat the Hulk or be killed. The Abomination tricks the Hulk into an alliance and betrays Ross by attempting to ransom the captured Kennedy Space Center. The plan fails when the Hulk turns on the Abomination and the pair fight, with the Abomination being caught on a rocket when it explodes.

An illusion of the Abomination also appears with illusions of other Hulk foes when the Hulk (at the time possessing the intelligence of Banner, thanks to being made to a device called the Encephalo-Helmet) enters the brain of Colonel Glenn Talbot at microscopic size to excise a mental block placed in Talbot's mind by the Gremlin.

The Abomination eventually reappears as a servant of the alien entity the Galaxy Master, having been empowered with even greater strength. After another extended battle with the Hulk, the Hulk attacks and destroys the Galaxy Master, causing the Abomination to weaken and apparently become lost in space. When MODOK invades Hulkbuster Base, he colludes with General Ross to revive the Abomination, who was found in a block of ice above Earth and kept in cryogenic storage for further study. MODOK intends to use the Abomination against his superiors at A.I.M., while Ross wants to use him to destroy the Hulk. The Abomination, however, has become afraid of the Hulk as a result of their past battles and has to be mentally forced by MODOK to even fight the Hulk. MODOK, however, is ousted by A.I.M., and a hesitant Abomination is beaten by the Hulk when he intervenes to save Banner's laboratory assistant. The Abomination refuses to rejoin the fight, and is disintegrated by MODOK.

During the Secret Wars II storyline, the Abomination is restored by the demon-lord Mephisto, who directs the Abomination and other villains against the cosmic entity the Beyonder as a member of the Legion Accursed.

The restoration is temporary, as a still-disembodied Abomination's atoms mingle with the disembodied atoms of the villain Tyrannus, who reintegrates the Abomination's body and places it under his mind's control. Tyrannus, as the Abomination, then comes into conflict with the Gray Hulk, and quickly defeats the weaker version of their foe. When the Hulk reverts to Banner, Tyrannus forces him to create a procedure that will remove Blonsky's mind, who is mentally fighting Tyrannus' mind for control of the Abomination's body. The process is successful and Blonksy is restored to his human form, free of Tyrannus, whose mind is still occupying the form of the Abomination. An enraged Gray Hulk defeats Tyrannus, who is placed into custody by the organization S.H.I.E.L.D.

After encounters against Avengers Wonder Man and Hawkeye, the Tyrannus-controlled Abomination reappears during the "Atlantis Attacks" storyline with the Deviant Ghaur freeing Tyrannus from the body of the Abomination by restoring Tyrannus' mind to a duplicate of his own body and placing Blonsky's mind within the Abomination's body once more. The process drives Blonksy insane, and he battles heroes Spider-Man and the She-Hulk, managing to knock both unconscious. The Abomination is eventually driven off when set on fire by the She-Hulk. The Abomination's mental faculties eventually return and the Abomination reappears in the "Countdown" storyline as a pawn of another Hulk foe, the Leader. The Abomination is sent to a toxic waste site to collect samples and encounters the gray version of the Hulk again, who is outmatched and also weak due to being poisoned. The Hulk, however, throws the Abomination into toxic waste that partially dissolves and horribly scars the Abomination.

The Abomination temporarily teams with villains Titania and Gargantua and finds and stalks his former wife, Nadia (a famous ballet dancer). The Abomination captures her and after taking her into the New York City sewers, reveals his true identity. After a brief skirmish, the Hulk persuades the Abomination to free his wife.

The Abomination is also captured by the robot Sentinels, but is eventually freed by the X-Men.

After befriending a woman who finds her way into the sewers, the Abomination battles Namor the Sub-Mariner during an attempt to save his kidnapped former wife. The Abomination retaliates against the NYPD when the Police Commissioner orders the sewers be cleared of all homeless, who the Abomination has placed under his protection. After killing several police officers, he is eventually driven away when confronted by the Hulk. The Abomination battles the mutant Nate Grey (who is searching the sewers for his lover and fellow mutant Threnody, who had been one of the homeless followers of the Abomination), who uses his mental abilities to trick the Abomination in thinking that he defeated Grey. He battles a delusional Hulk before encountering the Angel when the mutant visits the sewers in which he was once captured and maimed during the "Fall of the Mutants" storyline.

When Betty Ross dies in the title Hulk, Banner mistakenly thinks her proximity to the Hulk has induced a fatal case of radiation poisoning. Using a gamma device, a vindictive General Ross tracks what he believes to be the Hulk to a destroyed town, where the Abomination reveals he was the true culprit. Despite baiting a newly arrived Hulk, the Abomination is unable to force the Hulk to fight and departs.

The circumstances of Betty's death are eventually revealed: Blonksy's transformation into the Abomination apparently alienates his former wife Nadia, driving his hatred of Banner; Blonsky, deciding to deprive Banner of Betty in return, secretly poisons her with his radioactive blood. After hearing the Abomination's admission, Banner eventually discovers the truth and the Hulk defeats the Abomination in combat. Taken into custody by the military, Blonsky is forced to watch old home movies of him and his wife together (prior to his transformation) as punishment. Operatives from a secret organization "Home Base" eventually release the Abomination to battle the Hulk, and although able to taunt the Hulk about Betty's murder, he is defeated once again. This encounter is later revealed to be a dream generated by longtime Doctor Strange foe Nightmare in an effort to torture the Hulk.

After a humorous encounter with the demigod Hercules, in which the Abomination is chosen as an adversary for the hero while he completes the modern version of the 12 Labours of Hercules, the Abomination is pardoned and employed by the U.S. government as a hit man against hostile foreign powers. The Abomination is also a conflicted opponent for the heroine the She-Hulk (currently employed by the spy organization S.H.I.E.L.D.). The Abomination has a subtle but significant role in the World War Hulk storyline, being the source of gamma-irradiated DNA that allows the creation of an anti-Hulk response team.

The Abomination reappears after the events of World War Hulk, encountering a new foe called the Red Hulk. This new opponent savagely beats, shoots, and kills the Abomination. Later on, it is revealed that the Abomination's killer, the Red Hulk, is actually General Ross's gamma-powered alter ego; he killed Blonsky as an act of revenge for his deliberate gamma poisoning (and later death) of Ross's daughter Betty.

During the "Dark Reign" storyline, the Abomination is among the dead characters present at Zeus's trial. Abomination reappears in the court of Pluto, attacking the Olympian god when he loses power over the dead.

During the "Chaos War" storyline, the Abomination is among the dead characters in the Underworld that Pluto liberated in order to help defend the Underworld from Amatsu-Mikaboshi. The Abomination fights the Hulk and his allies until Marlo Chandler taps into the Death essence within her to destroy his undead body.

A shadow organization (later revealed to be the Order of the Shield) bent on gaining control of the Hulk harvests biological material from a mortally wounded Bruce Banner. After Banner regains consciousness following the experiment and escapes as the Hulk, the organization uses this material to resurrect the Abomination under their control, leaving him "free of a mind or a conscience" and with an ability to seek out Banner/the Hulk for retrieval. The Hulk defeats the Abomination yet again with the aid of the Avengers. Iron Man uses technology taken from the Order of the Shield agents to teleport the Abomination into interplanetary space estimated to be "somewhere in the vicinity of Jupiter".

Tissue samples of the Abomination were later used by the U.S. Hulk Operations to graft to the corpse of Rick Jones that revives him as an Abomination/A-Bomb-like creature that Dr. Charlene McGowan calls Subject B.

After ripping Rick Jones from Subject B's body in a brutal battle, Hulk Operations Commanding Officer General Reginald Fortean teleports to Gamma Flight Headquarters in space, killing Sasquatch and temporarily killing Doctor Samson to retrieve the Subject B husk. Fortean then willingly fuses himself with the body.

After returning to Earth, Abomination started his own company called Green Spring which makes gamma mutates. After finding a depowered Skaar, Abomination had him repowered and sent him to retrieve Stockpile. After Skaar's mission led to his encounter with Gamma Flight and the U.S. Hulkbuster Force, Abomination and Dr. Aliana Alba were shown to have watched the fight and commented on the powers of the gamma mutates that was shown off.

During the "Devil's Reign" storyline, Abomination appears as a member of the Thunderbolts and shows up to stop Jessica Jones and the Champions from interfering in the Thunderbolts' apprehension of most of the Purple Children. As Jessica notes that Abomination would not normally be someone to work for Mayor Wilson Fisk, Abomination states that Mayor Fisk has the information that he seeks. The recruitment of Abomination was the result of Rhino leaving the group as he crossed the line of hunting children.

Powers and abilities
The Abomination is similar to the Hulk in terms of strength, stamina, speed, and durability, including his healing factor. In contrast with the Hulk, he retains his intellect after transforming and cannot change back into human form. He also possesses gills, enabling him to breathe underwater. Due to extreme pain, cold, or bereft of oxygen, he could enter into suspended animation for long periods. Initially, the Abomination is twice as strong as the Hulk, but unlike the Hulk, his strength does not increase/decrease in proportion to level of rage, with result that the Hulk is able to gain an advantage over the Abomination if the fight takes a sufficient amount of time for him to unleash his anger.

After being empowered by Amatsu-Mikaboshi, an undead Abomination is considerably larger than before. Formerly, he could project hellfire and was strong enough to rip an armored shell off of his successor A-Bomb (something that even the Red Hulk had previously been unable to do). After his second resurrection by this Illuminati-dubbed Order of the Shield, a cloned Abomination gains more augmentation through Banner's biological grafts. Currently, he has the ability to track down the Hulk anywhere at will. Another feature for him is also to manipulate his own gamma ray output in such a way that he can make it toxic and overwhelm the most resilient of individuals, including energy absorbers such as the Hulk, Captain Marvel, and Sunspot.

Reception

Critical reception 
IGN ranked Abomination 54th in their "Top 100 Comic Book Villains" list, writing, "When you have a character built up to be as incredibly (forgive the term) strong as the Hulk, it becomes nearly impossible to give him a credible threat. Enter the Abomination - created, for all intents and purposes, as the evil version of the Hulk," and ranked him 24th in their "Top 25 Marvel Villains" list. Screen Rant included Abomination in their "15 Most Powerful She-Hulk Villains" list, and in their "10 Most Powerful Wonder Man Villains In Marvel Comics" list, and ranked him 3rd in their "Hulk's Main Comic Book Villains, Ranked Lamest To Coolest" list, 4th in their "10 Most Powerful Hulk Villains In Marvel Comics" list. CBR.com ranked Abomination 2nd in their " Definitive Ranking Of The Hulk's 20 Most Powerful Enemies" list, 3rd in their "Hulk’s 10 Most Powerful Villains" list, 6th in their "10 Most Violent Marvel Villains" list, and 19th in their "Marvel's 20 Strongest Villains" list.

Imitators

Abominatrix
The Abominatrix formally known as Florence Sharples was the manager at Jasper Keaton's savings and loans company. She became the Abominatrix due to a failed medical experiment done by Jasper Keaton's medical facility and fought the She-Hulk.

Teen Abomination
The Teen Abomination is a 13-year-old boy who was exposed to gamma radiation and became a teenage version of the Abomination.

Reginald Fortean
During The Immortal Hulk run by Al Ewing and Ryan Bodenheim, Desert Base Director Reginald Fortean accidentally turned himself into another version of the Abomination when he came in contact with the gamma activated tissue husk/armor of Subject B which was previously used on the decreased Rick Jones.

Other versions

JLA/Avengers
During JLA/Avengers, the Abomination is among the villains enthralled by Krona to defend his stronghold, but is defeated by Superman.

Ultimate Marvel
The Ultimate Marvel equivalent of the Abomination appears as part of an international group. This version is a Chinese scientist named Dr. Chang Lam. Dr. Lam was working to create a more efficient version of the Hulk. When he believed his research was complete, he used the formula on himself. When he transformed into a dinosaur-like giant, he retained control of his permanently enhanced form because of his lack of mental disorders, serving with the Liberators. He battled with the Hulk, believing that his intact intellect would allow him to easily beat him, but ended up ultimately being killed in the duel.

The Ultimate iteration of Emil Blonsky (under "the Abomination" codename) is part of Nick Fury's Howling Commandos team and has the ability to Hulk out.

Abomination Deathlok
On Earth-11045, a variant of Emil Blonsky molded with Deathlok technology appears as Abomination Deathlok as a member of Kang the Conqueror's Chronos Corps.

Abominations
The character also stars in the limited series Abominations, which continues plot points from the Future Imperfect storyline. A group of time-travelling assassins from the time of the villain the Maestro—sent by an alternate version of the Abomination called "Emil"—arrive in the present, intent on killing Betty-6, a futuristic version of Betty Ross who is pregnant with the Maestro's child. The Abomination provides shelter for Betty-6 and prevents the assassination.

Mutant X
In the Mutant X universe, the Abomination appears as a part of a group that opposed the Beyonder and died after.

Marvel Zombies
A zombified Abomination appears in Marvel Zombies: Dead Days. Thor kills him by destroying his head with Mjolnir during the battle between the surviving heroes and the zombie horde.

In other media

Television
 The Emil Blonsky incarnation of the Abomination appears in The Incredible Hulk (1996), voiced by Richard Moll. This version serves the Leader as one of his Gamma Warriors.
 The Emil Blonsky incarnation of the Abomination appears in The Super Hero Squad Show, voiced by Steve Blum. This version is a member of Doctor Doom's Lethal Legion and serves as the group's comic relief along with MODOK.
 The Emil Blonsky incarnation of the Abomination appears in The Avengers: Earth's Mightiest Heroes, voiced by Robin Atkin Downes. In the short episode, "This Monster, This Hero", he is incarcerated in the Cube. In the episode "Breakout, Part 1", the Abomination and his fellow prisoners escape following the Cube's sudden power failure. He briefly engages the Hulk, who retreats with Doc Samson, enabling the Abomination, the Leader, and the Absorbing Man to gain control of the Cube. In the two-part episode "Gamma World", the Abomination assists the Leader in a plot to turn everyone in the world into gamma monsters. However, the Avengers foil them, with the Hulk engaging the Abomination and throwing him into a nearby desert. The Abomination is later approached by and recruited into the Masters of Evil. Throughout the episodes "Masters of Evil", "This Hostage Earth", and "Acts of Vengeance", the Abomination continues to work with them until they are eventually captured by the Avengers and incarcerated in Prison 42.
 The Emil Blonsky incarnation of the Abomination appears in Lego Marvel Super Heroes: Maximum Overload, voiced again by Robin Atkin Downes.
 The Emil Blonsky incarnation of the Abomination appears in Hulk and the Agents of S.M.A.S.H., voiced again by Robin Atkin Downes.
 The Emil Blonsky incarnation of the Abomination appears in Marvel Disk Wars: The Avengers, voiced Masaya Takatsuka in the Japanese version and again by Robin Atkin Downes in the English dub. This version is a member of the Masters of Evil.
 The Emil Blonsky incarnation of the Abomination appears in the Ultimate Spider-Man episode "Contest of Champions" [Pt. 1], voiced again by Robin Atkin Downes.
 The Emil Blonsky incarnation of the Abomination appears in the Avengers Assemble episode "Seeing Double."

Film

 The Emil Blonsky incarnation of the Abomination appears in Iron Man & Hulk: Heroes United, voiced again by Robin Atkin Downes.

Marvel Cinematic Universe 

The Emil Blonsky incarnation of the Abomination appears in media set in the Marvel Cinematic Universe, portrayed by Tim Roth, who also voices and provides motion capture for the Abomination.
 Introduced in the film The Incredible Hulk (2008), this version is a Russian-born British Royal Marine on loan to General Thaddeus Ross's Hulkbuster Unit. Wanting to relive his glory days, Blonsky volunteers to be injected with a sample of an imperfect super soldier serum. While it increases his physical capabilities to superhuman levels, it leaves Blonsky power-hungry and eventually drives him to seek out Dr. Samuel Sterns and force him to inject the former with Bruce Banner's blood. Blonsky is mutated into a monstrous "abomination", according to Sterns, and runs amok, destroying Harlem before he is defeated by the Hulk and handed over to General Ross.
 Blonsky appears in the Marvel One-Shot short film The Consultant via archive footage. S.H.I.E.L.D. agents Phil Coulson and Jasper Sitwell meet to discuss their director, Nick Fury, disagreeing with the World Security Council's attempts to exonerate Blonsky and put him on the Avengers Initiative and formulate a plan to help Fury. At Sitwell's urging, Coulson reluctantly sends in Tony Stark to sabotage the meeting with General Ross, as partially shown in The Incredible Hulks post-credits scene.
 During an interview in December 2014, Roth revealed that he was offered to reprise his role in the film Avengers: Age of Ultron, but plans fell through during pre-production.
 Roth provides uncredited vocals for Blonsky in the film Shang-Chi and the Legend of the Ten Rings. As of this film, the Abomination has mutated further, now possessing darker, scaly skin, gills, and webbed ears. As part of his training to become the Sorcerer Supreme, Wong kidnaps Blonsky so they can compete in an underground fight club in Macau. After their fight, he leaves with Wong via a portal and willingly returns to his cell despite being offered freedom.
 Roth reprises his role as Blonsky in the Disney+ series She-Hulk: Attorney at Law. In the years since his imprisonment, Blonsky has gained control of his Abomination form, decided to atone for his past actions, and opened a self-healing support group called Abomaste, making him eligible for parole. Throughout the episodes "Superhuman Law" and "The People vs. Emil Blonsky", he becomes a client of Jennifer Walters, who agrees to defend him in court after hearing his plea and receiving Banner's blessing. Despite footage of his fight with Wong being leaked, Blonsky is successfully paroled on the condition he wear an inhibitor to negate his transformations. As of the episode "The Retreat", he has opened a spiritual retreat called Summer Twilight. In the episode "Whose Show Is This?" Blonsky violates his parole to attend an Intelligencia event as a motivational speaker in his Abomination form. Despite being arrested and returned to prison, Wong breaks him out once more and brings him to Kamar-Taj.

Video games
 Emil Blonsky / Abomination appears as a boss and recurring mini-boss in The Incredible Hulk (1994).
 Emil Blonsky / Abomination appears as the final boss of and an unlockable playable character in The Incredible Hulk: Ultimate Destruction, voiced by Ron Perlman. This version is an NSA agent given control of NSA branch, the Division, who seeks to use Bruce Banner's research to cure his wife Nadia's ovarian cancer. However, he is infected with a vial of Banner's DNA and exposed to gamma radiation, which slowly transforms him into the Abomination over the course of the game. While fighting the Hulk, the Abomination destroys a nearby dam with the intention of killing civilians, but is foiled. Refusing to give up, the Abomination smashes the dam apart and disappears in the oncoming flood.
 Emil Blonsky / Abomination appears as the final boss of and alternate skin for the Hulk in The Incredible Hulk 2008 film tie-in game, voiced by Tim Roth.
 Emil Blonsky / Abomination appears as a boss and an unlockable playable character in Marvel Super Hero Squad, voiced again by Steve Blum.
 Emil Blonsky / Abomination appears as a boss in Marvel Super Hero Squad: The Infinity Gauntlet, voiced again by Steve Blum. Additionally, he is available as an unlockable playable character through the PS3 and Xbox 360 exclusive DLC "Doom on the Loose."
 Emil Blonsky / Abomination appears as a boss and an unlockable character in Marvel Super Hero Squad Online, voiced again by Steve Blum.
 Emil Blonsky / Abomination appears as a boss in Marvel Super Hero Squad: Comic Combat, voiced again by Steve Blum.
 Emil Blonsky / Abomination appears as a boss in Avengers Initiative, voiced again by Steve Blum.
 Emil Blonsky / Abomination appears as a boss and an unlockable playable character in Lego Marvel Super Heroes, voiced again by Steve Blum.
 Emil Blonsky / Abomination appears as an unlockable playable character in Lego Marvel's Avengers.
 Emil Blonsky / Abomination appears as a playable character in Marvel: Future Fight.
 Emil Blonsky / Abomination appears in the digital collectible card game Marvel Snap.
 Emil Blonsky / Abomination appears as a boss in Marvel's Avengers, voiced by Jamieson Price. This version is a former Special Forces operative who was mutated into the Abomination by A.I.M., who experimented on him in an attempt to replicate the Hulk's powers. Blonsky began assisting A.I.M. with their operations whenever his skills were required and eventually became one of the organization's top operatives. Additionally, several clones of him appear in side missions.

Merchandise
 Emil Blonsky / Abomination received a figure in Toy Biz's Hulk Classics line.
 Emil Blonsky / Abomination received a figure in the Marvel Legends line.
 The MCU incarnation of Emil Blonsky / Abomination received a figure in May 2008.
 Emil Blonsky / Abomination appears in Heroscape's Marvel Comics expansion.
 Emil Blonsky / Abomination received a figure in the Marvel Select line.

See also
List of Hulk supporting characters

References

External links
Abomination at Marvel.com

Characters created by Gil Kane
Characters created by Stan Lee
Clone characters in comics
Comics characters introduced in 1967
Fictional characters with nuclear or radiation abilities
Fictional characters with slowed ageing
Fictional characters with superhuman durability or invulnerability
Fictional Croatian people
Fictional KGB agents
Fictional Russian people
Fictional secret agents and spies
Fictional Yugoslav people
Marvel Comics characters who can move at superhuman speeds
Marvel Comics characters with accelerated healing
Marvel Comics characters with superhuman senses
Marvel Comics characters with superhuman strength
Marvel Comics film characters
Marvel Comics male supervillains
Marvel Comics military personnel
Marvel Comics mutates
Marvel Comics undead characters
Video game bosses
Villains in animated television series